The Man Who Could Not Laugh (Norwegian: Mannen som ikke kunne le) is a 1968 Norwegian comedy film. The title role is played by Rolv Wesenlund. Harald Heide-Steen Jr. plays the psychologist with the task of teaching him to laugh. The film also stars the film's director, Bo Hermansson.

The film is considered a Norwegian classic and showcases a famous comedic duo in Wesenlund and Heide-Steen.

Cast
Rolv Wesenlund ...  Mr. Sonell, the man who can't laugh
Birgitta Andersson ...  Stina, his Swedish girlfriend
Harald Heide-Steen Jr. ...  The psychiatrist
Thea Stabell ...  The nurse
Wenche Myhre ...  The singer
Martin Ljung ...  Himself
Sverre Wilberg ...  Mandrake
Arve Opsahl ...  Himself
Alf Prøysen ...  Audience in the barn
Bjørn Sand ...  The comedian
Bengt Calmeyer ...  The interviewer
Stein Mehren ...  Himself
Per Øivind Heradstveit ...  TV interviewer

External links

Man who could not Laugh
1960s Norwegian-language films
Man who could not Laugh
Man who could not laugh